`

Lieutenant-Colonel Henry William Edmund Petty-Fitzmaurice, 6th Marquess of Lansdowne, DSO, MVO (14 January 1872 – 5 March 1936), styled Earl of Kerry until 1927, was a British soldier and politician.

Background
Lansdowne was the son of Henry Petty-FitzMaurice, 5th Marquess of Lansdowne, and his wife, Maud, daughter of James Hamilton, 1st Duke of Abercorn and Lady Louisa Jane Russell.

Military career
Lord Kerry was originally commissioned into a volunteer battalion of the Oxfordshire Light Infantry, but transferred to the regular army as a second lieutenant in the Grenadier Guards on 14 August 1895, and was promoted to lieutenant on 2 March 1898. He served in South Africa during the Second Boer War, where he was from 25 January 1900 an extra aide-de camp to Lord Roberts, the commander in chief of British Forces in South Africa. For his service in the war, he was awarded the Distinguished Service Order (DSO). On the formation of the Irish Guards in 1900, he transferred to that regiment while still in South Africa, and was promoted captain on 6 October 1900. He resigned in 1906 with the rank of major. He returned to the Army during the First World War, reaching the rank of lieutenant-colonel.

Political career
Lansdowne was Liberal Unionist and later Conservative member of parliament (MP) for West Derbyshire from 1908–18. He was a member of the Senate of the Irish Free State from 1922 to 1929, to which he was nominated by the executive council. He succeeded his father as Marquess of Lansdowne in 1927, with a seat in the British House of Lords, meaning that he had the unusual distinction of serving in the national legislatures of two different countries at the same time.

Family

He married Elizabeth Caroline Hope, on 16 February 1904, granddaughter of George William Hope and Sir John Leslie, 1st Baronet. They had five children:

Katherine Evelyn Constance Petty-Fitzmaurice (1912–1995), married 1933 Edward Clive Bigham, 3rd Viscount Mersey (1906–1979) and had issue. She became 12th Baroness of Nairne after inheriting the title and Derreen House and Gardens (Lauragh, County Kerry, Ireland) from her brother Charles Hope Petty-Fitzmaurice, 7th Marquess of Lansdowne in 1944.
Henry Maurice John Petty-Fitzmaurice, Earl of Kerry (1913–1933), died young
Charles Hope Petty-Fitzmaurice, 7th Marquess of Lansdowne (1917–1944), killed in action in Italy.
Lieutenant Lord Edward Norman Petty-Fitzmaurice (1922–1944), killed in action in Normandy.
Lady Elizabeth Mary Petty-Fitzmaurice (1927–2016), married the late Major Charles William Lambton, grandson of George Lambton, 2nd Earl of Durham, and had issue.

Alva Vanderbilt once considered him a suitable match for her daughter Consuelo, but instead she married his maternal first cousin, the Duke of Marlborough in 1895.

He died in Marylebone, aged 64.

References

External links

Lansdowne, Henry Petty-Fitzmaurice, 6th Marquess of
Lansdowne, Henry Petty-Fitzmaurice, 6th Marquess of
British Army personnel of the Second Boer War
British Army personnel of World War I
Lansdowne, Henry Petty-Fitzmaurice, 6th Marquess of
Lansdowne, Henry Petty-Fitzmaurice, 6th Marquess of
Lansdowne, Henry Petty-Fitzmaurice, 6th Marquess of
Petty-Fitzmaurice, Henry
Lansdowne, Henry Petty-Fitzmaurice, 6th Marquess of
Lansdowne, Henry Petty-Fitzmaurice, 6th Marquess of
Petty-Fitzmaurice, Henry
Petty-Fitzmaurice, Henry
Petty-Fitzmaurice, Henry
Lansdowne, M6
Petty-Fitzmaurice, Henry
Petty-Fitzmaurice, Henry
Petty-Fitzmaurice, Henry
Members of the Parliament of the United Kingdom for constituencies in Derbyshire
Members of London County Council
6
Petty-Fitzmaurice, Henry
Independent members of Seanad Éireann
Earls of Kerry